Lara Casanova (born 25 October 1996) is a Swiss snowboarder. She competed at the 2018 Winter Olympics, and at the 2022 Winter Olympics, in Women's snowboard cross.

References

1996 births
Living people
Snowboarders at the 2018 Winter Olympics
Snowboarders at the 2022 Winter Olympics
Swiss female snowboarders
Olympic snowboarders of Switzerland
21st-century Swiss women